Intramuros is a literary review dedicated to biography, autobiography and the memory genre, with half-yearly frequency. The review collaborates with European cultural institutions like Eunic Spain (National Institutes of culture of UE), Cultural Italian Institute of Madrid, and Goethe Institute of Madrid. Moreover, it participates in the Erasmus Placement programme and Leonardo da Vinci programme, which belong to the European Community.

History 
The review was instituted in Buenos Aires in 1994, by Beltrán Gambier and María Sheila Cremaschi.

Editorial line
The first numbers of Intramuros were dedicated to the "Minimal autobiography" question. Then, in a second time, Intramuros worked about cultural bridge Madrid/Buenos Aires. Actually, the review edits monographic numbers dedicated to countries and cities such as (Berlin, Germany, Italy, France, Israel, Argentina, Greece, Egypt and Turkey). The last number, ♯31, was dedicated to the 20th anniversary commemoration of the fall of the Berlin Wall.

Review summaries 

Summary of number 1
Summary of number 2
Summary of number 3
Summary of number 4
Summary of number 5
Summary of number 6
Summary of number 7
Summary of number 8
Summary of number 9
Summary of number 10
Summary of number 11
Summary of number 12
Summary of number 13
Summary of number 14
Summary of number 15
Summary of number 16-17 (Berlin) 
Summary of number 18-19 (Alemania) 
Summary of number 20 (Italia) 
Summary of number 21 (Italia) 
Summary of number 22 (France) 
Summary of number 23 (Israel) 
Summary of number 24 (French-speaking world) 
Summary of number 25 (Argentina) 
Summary of number 26 (Morocco) 
Summary of number 27 (Greece) 
Summary of number 28 (Egypt)
Summary of number 29 (Turkey) 
Summary of number 30 (Minimal autobiography)

See also
 List of magazines in Spain

References

External links 
 
ARCE (Association of cultural reviews of Spain)
revistasculturales.com
quioscocultural.com

1994 establishments in Argentina
Biannual magazines
Literary magazines published in Spain
Magazines established in 1994
Magazines published in Buenos Aires
Magazines published in Madrid
Spanish-language magazines